Guatemala is scheduled to compete at the 2023 Pan American Games in Santiago, Chile from October 20 to November 5, 2023. This will be Guatemala's 19th appearance at the Pan American Games, having competed at every edition of the Games.

Competitors
The following is the list of number of competitors (per gender) participating at the games per sport/discipline.

Archery

Guatemala qualified two archers during the 2022 Pan American Archery Championships.

Men

Bowling

Guatemala qualified a team of two women.

Cycling

BMX
Guatemala qualified two female cyclists in BMX race through the UCI World Rankings.

Racing

Road
Guatemala qualified 1 cyclist at the Central American Championships.

Men

Modern pentathlon

Guatemala qualified five modern pentathletes (two men and three women).

Sailing

Guatemala has qualified 2 boats for a total of 2 sailors.

Men

Women

Shooting

Guatemala qualified a total of 17 shooters after the 2022 Americas Shooting Championships.

Men
Pistol and rifle

Men
Shotgun

Women
Pistol and rifle

Women
Shotgun

Wrestling

Guatemala qualified one wrestler (Greco-Roman: 77 kg) through the 2022 Pan American Wrestling Championships held in Acapulco, Mexico.

Men

References

Nations at the 2023 Pan American Games
2023